The Otterburn Army Training Estate is a military training area near Otterburn, Northumberland, in northern England. It is owned by the UK's Ministry of Defence (MoD) and operated by Landmarc on contract from the MoD's Defence Infrastructure Organisation. The range is used for training up to 30,000 soldiers per year. The National Park was established in 1956, 45 years after establishment of the Artillery Range.

Otterburn is the UK's largest firing range, and is in frequent use.  The ranges are used by AS-90 artillery and M270 Multiple Launch Rocket Systems; Otterburn is the only place in the UK where the MLRS can be fired, requiring an 11 mile long by 2 mile wide firing range.  Because of the danger posed by live fire exercises, recreational use of the area is restricted, although it is possible for the public to use some parts of the estate subject to the relevant bylaws. The MoD publishes a booklet, Walks on Ministry of Defence Lands, which offers advice on this.

Gallery

References

External links

 DTE Otterburn - Public information leaflet, Defence Estates, Ministry of Defence
 Otterburn firing times, Defence Infrastructure Organisation, Ministry of Defence

Bombing ranges
Cheviot Hills
Geography of Northumberland
Otterburn, Northumberland
Sites of Special Scientific Interest in Northumberland
Training establishments of the British Army
Military training areas in the United Kingdom